Shyam Lal College is a north campus college of University of Delhi, It was established in 1964 by Shyam Lal Gupta the then Chairman of Shyam lal Charitable Trust.

History
Shyam Lal is co-educational. The foundation stone of college was laid by Zakir Hussain, the then the Vice President of India and Chancellor of the University of Delhi.

The college is housed in its own building at G.T. Road, Shahadra, near Welcome metro station. In 2022 it is ranked 77th across India by National Institutional Ranking Framework in 2022.

See also
Education in India
Literacy in India
List of institutions of higher education in Delhi

References

External links
Official College Website

Universities and colleges in Delhi
1964 establishments in Delhi
Educational institutions established in 1964